The Ådalen Line is a  railway line between Sundsvall and Långsele in Sweden. At Sundsvall, the line intersects with the Central Line and the East Coast Line. At Långsele, the line intersects with the Main Line Through Upper Norrland. It also connects to the Bothnia Line.

The Ådalen Line follows, and is named for, the Ådalen river valley.

Railway stations with stops for passenger trains are (as of 2018):
 Västeraspby (Höga Kusten Airport)
 Kramfors
 Härnösand
 Timrå
 Sundsvall Västra (West)
 Sundsvall Central

History
Traditionally the line now known as the Ådalen Line consisting of three sections. The connection from Sollefteå and Långsele was built by the Swedish State Railways and opened in 1886, at the same time as the northern part of the Main Line Through Upper Norrland from Ragunda to Långsele. The private Härnösand–Sollefteå Railway (Härnösand-Sollefteå Järnväg) received a concession for a private railway in 1888, and opened in 1893. The section from Härnösand to Sundsvall was originally built as part of the East Coast Line and opened in 1925, two years before the line was completed to Gävle.

Renovation
The Swedish Transport Administration upgraded  of the line, and built  of new track, from Sundsvall to the connection with the new high-speed Bothnia Line north of Nyland. The upgrades both include renewal of existing track, and two new section of track. Along with the Bothnia Line and the East Coast Line, the Ådalen Line is the new high-speed main line along the East Coast of Sweden, from Stockholm to Umeå.

This section has eight new tunnels, totaling .

The upgrades were completed in September 2012.

References

Railway lines in Sweden
Railway lines opened in 1886